The 2015–16 Elite Ice Hockey League season was the 13th season of the Elite Ice Hockey League. The regular season began in September 2015 and ended in March 2016.

On 30 April 2014, the Elite League had announced changes to the import rules which would apply to the 2015-16 season: the number of non British-trained players would rise from 12 to 13, while the number of work-permit players would remain at 11.

Teams

The ten teams were split into two conferences. Teams played the sides in their conferences four times, home and away (32 games), and played the sides in the other conferences twice, home and away (20 games).

The season was marked by the disappearance of the Hull Stingrays, who were replaced by the Manchester Phoenix, the first top-level team to play in the city since Manchester Storm folded in 2002-03.

Conference champions Sheffield Steelers and Braehead Clan took first and third spot in the league, but, in a repeat of the previous season, neither side could continue their success in the playoffs, which was won by Nottingham Panthers, who beat Coventry Blaze 2-0 in the final.

The Challenge Cup was also won by the Panthers who beat the Cardiff Devils in a 1-0 overtime win. 

Erhardt Conference

Gardiner Conference

Standings

Overall

Erhardt Conference
Only intra-conference games counted towards the Erhardt Conference standings. Each team played the other four teams in the Conference eight times, for a total of 32 matches.

Gardiner Conference
Only intra-conference games counted towards the Gardiner Conference standings. Each team played the other four teams in the Conference eight times, for a total of 32 matches.

League Officials

References

Elite Ice Hockey League seasons
1
United